Raymond Carré de Malberg (1861–1935) was a French jurist and one of France's leading constitutional scholars.

As professor of public law in Caen, Nancy and Strasbourg, Carré de Malberg developed a thorough positivist theory and critique of French constitutional law, influenced by interwar German thought as expressed in the Weimar Constitution.

Although his works, including Contribution à la théorie générale de l'Etat (1920) and  La loi, expression de la volonté générale (1931), became much-cited classics in post-war French scholarship, they have found little reception abroad.

References

External links
 

French jurists
1861 births
1935 deaths
20th-century jurists